Syagrus is a genus  of Arecaceae (palms), native to South America, with one species endemic to the Lesser Antilles. The genus is closely related to the Cocos, or coconut genus, and many Syagrus species produce edible seeds similar to the coconut.

Description
Palms in this genus usually have solitary stems; clustered stems are less common, and a few are stolon-like subterranean. The stems are normally spineless, but some species have spiny leaf sheaths or spines.

The leaves of all but one species, S. smithii, are pinnately compound. Leaf sheaths are split along their entire length, and consequently, crownshafts are not present in this genus.

The inflorescences are unbranched or branch once; a single hybrid, S. × lacerdamourae, occasionally shows second-order branching, and emerge from between the leaves. They are monoecious, with both male and female flowers borne in the same inflorescence. The fruit are drupes, which vary in colour from green to orange to brown.

Taxonomy

Syagrus has been placed in the subfamily Arecoideae, the tribe Cocoseae and the subtribe Attaleinae, together with the genera Allagoptera, Attalea, Beccariophoenix, Butia, Cocos, Jubaea, Jubaeopsis, Parajubaea, and Voanioala.

Distribution 
Syagrus is an almost entirely South American genus. The only non-South American species, S. amara, is endemic to five islands in the Lesser Antilles. The genus is found from sea level to elevations of above sea level.

Ecology
S. coronata nuts are the favored food of Lear's macaw, whose bill size and shape are particularly adapted to crack them.

Syagrus species are used as food plants by the larvae of some Lepidoptera species including Batrachedra nuciferae (recorded on S. coronae) and Paysandisia archon (recorded on S. romanzoffiana).

Species

 Syagrus allagopteroides Noblick & Lorenzi
 Syagrus amara (Jacq.) Mart. – overtop palm
 Syagrus angustifolia Noblick & Lorenzi
 Syagrus botryophora (Mart.) Mart.
 Syagrus caerulescens Noblick & Lorenzi
 Syagrus campestris (Mart.) Bomhard
 Syagrus campylospatha (Barb.Rodr.) Becc.
 Syagrus cardenasii Glassman
 Syagrus cearensis Noblick 
 Syagrus cerqueirana Noblick & Lorenzi
 Syagrus cocoides Mart.
 Syagrus comosa (Mart.) Mart.
 Syagrus coronata (Mart.) Becc. – licuri palm
 Syagrus deflexa Noblick & Lorenzi
 Syagrus duartei Glassman
 Syagrus evansiana Noblick
 Syagrus flexuosa (Mart.) Becc.
 Syagrus glaucescens Glaz. ex Becc.
 Syagrus glazioviana (Dammer) Becc.
 Syagrus gouveiana Noblick & Lorenzi
 Syagrus graminifolia (Drude) Becc.
 Syagrus harleyi Glassman
 Syagrus inajai (Spruce) Becc.
 Syagrus itacambirana Noblick & Lorenzi
 Syagrus kellyana Noblick & Lorenzi
 Syagrus lilliputiana (Barb.Rodr.) Becc.
 Syagrus loefgrenii Glassman
 Syagrus lorenzoniorum Noblick & Lorenzi
 Syagrus macrocarpa Barb.Rodr.
 Syagrus mendanhensis Glassman
 Syagrus microphylla Burret
 Syagrus minor Noblick & Lorenzi
 Syagrus oleracea (Mart.) Becc.
 Syagrus orinocensis (Spruce) Burret
 Syagrus petraea (Mart.) Becc.
 Syagrus picrophylla Barb.Rodr.
 Syagrus pimentae Noblick
 Syagrus pleioclada Burret
 Syagrus pleiocladoides Noblick & Lorenzi
 Syagrus pompeoi K. Soares & R. Pimenta
 Syagrus procumbens Noblick & Lorenzi
 Syagrus pseudococos (Raddi) Glassman
 Syagrus romanzoffiana (Cham.) Glassman – queen palm
 Syagrus rupicola Noblick & Lorenzi
 Syagrus ruschiana (Bondar) Glassman
 Syagrus sancona (Kunth) H. Karst.
 Syagrus santosii K. Soares & C.A. Guim.
 Syagrus schizophylla (Mart.) Glassman – arikury palm
 Syagrus smithii (H.E.Moore) Glassman
 Syagrus stenopetala Burret
 Syagrus stratincola Wess.Boer
 Syagrus vagans (Bondar) A.D. Hawkes
 Syagrus vermicularis Noblick
 Syagrus werdermannii Burret
 Syagrus yungasensis M. Moraes

Hybrids
 Syagrus × camposportoana (Bondar) Glassman
 Syagrus × costae Glassman
 Syagrus × fairchildensis Glassman
 Syagrus × matafome (Bondar) A.D. Hawkes
 Syagrus × teixeiriana Glassman
 Syagrus × tostana (Bondar) Glassman

Formerly placed here
 Butia campicola (Barb.Rodr.) Noblick (as S. campicola (Barb.Rodr.) Becc.)
 Butia capitata (Mart.) Becc. (as S. capitata (Mart.) Glassman)
 Butia eriospatha (Mart. ex Drude) Becc. (as S. eriospatha (Mart. ex Drude) Glassman)
 Butia paraguayensis (Barb.Rodr.) L.H.Bailey (as S. paraguayensis (Barb.Rodr.) Glassman)
 Butia yatay (Mart.) Becc. (as S. dyerana (Barb. Rodr.) Becc. and S. yatay (Mart.) Glassman)
 Lytocaryum weddellianum (H.Wendl.) Toledo (as S. insignis (hort. ex Drude) Becc. and S. weddelliana (H.Wendl.) Becc.)

References

 Jones, D. L. (2000). Palms in Australia. Reed Books.

External links
 

 
Arecaceae genera
Garden plants of South America
Neotropical realm flora